Gloria Trevi: Ellas soy yo is an upcoming Mexican biographical television series that will air on Las Estrellas. It is produced by Carla Estrada. The series is based on the life of Mexican singer Gloria Trevi. Scarlet Gruber will star as Trevi.

Cast 
 Scarlet Gruber as Gloria Trevi
 Regina Villaverde as Teen Gloria
 Lu Rosette as 11-year-old Gloria
 Valentina Delgado as 6-year-old Gloria
 Jorge Poza as César Augusto
 Ingrid Martz as Gloria Ruiz
 Lessy
 Majo Edgar
 Pamela Vargas
 Paulina Maya
 Ivanna Benítez
 Ignacio López Tarso

Production 
In May 2022, the series was announced at TelevisaUnivision's upfront for the 2022–2023 television season. Filming of the series began on 7 November 2022 in Mexico City. A few days later, Scarlet Gruber was announced in the lead role of Gloria Trevi in her adult years.

References

External links 
 

Upcoming television series
Television series by Televisa